The men's C-4 500 metres competition at the 2022 ICF Canoe Sprint World Championships in Dartmouth took place on Lake Banook.

Schedule
The schedule is as follows:

Results
With fewer than ten boats entered, this event was held as a direct final.

References

ICF